Lithobius peregrinus is a species of centipede in the Lithobiidae family. It was first described in 1880 by Austrian myriapodologist Robert Latzel.

Distribution
The species has a cosmopolitan distribution. The type locality is Dalmatia, in Croatia.

Behaviour
The centipedes are solitary terrestrial predators that inhabit plant litter and soil.

References

 

 
peregrinus
Myriapods of Europe
Centipedes of Australia
Animals described in 1880
Taxa named by Robert Latzel